The Beach Tower located in Jenkins Lane car park, Waterford is a 15th century crenelated building which is part of the city defences. It was built on a rocky outcrop overlooking the River Suir and forms a natural defensive position.
 

The tower is an excellent observation post with uninterrupted views both upriver to Granagh Castle and downriver beyond Reginald's Tower. From the city's defensive point of view this was important as attacks from the river occurred occasionally and in particular the fear was of a Spanish landing. It also enabled the observers to keep an eye on the city docks from above.

The tower, which was substantially rebuilt during the early 17th century, was a bastion citadel. It had a rectangular shape with corner bastions which are typical of 17th century forts in Ireland.

See also
 City walls map
 History of Waterford

References

Towers in the Republic of Ireland
Buildings and structures in Waterford (city)
History of Waterford (city)